Helix-loop-helix protein 1 is a protein that in humans is encoded by the NHLH1 gene.

The helix-loop-helix (HLH) proteins are a family of putative transcription factors, some of which have been shown to play an important role in growth and development of a wide variety of tissues and species. Four members of this family have been clearly implicated in tumorigenesis via their involvement in chromosomal translocations in lymphoid tumors: MYC (MIM 190080), LYL1 (MIM 151440), E2A (MIM 147141), and SCL (MIM 187040).[supplied by OMIM]

References

Further reading